This is a list of films produced by the Tollywood (Telugu language film industry) based in Hyderabad, India in the year 1992.

List of released films

Highest Grossing Films

Dubbed films

References

1992
Telugu
 Telugu films
1992 in Indian cinema